is an upcoming American thriller drama film directed by Jean-Stéphane Sauvaire and written by Ryan King and Ben Mac Brown, based on the 2008 novel of the same name by Shannon Burke. It stars Sean Penn, Tye Sheridan, Katherine Waterston, Michael Pitt, Mike Tyson, and Raquel Nave. The film is scheduled to be released in the United States by Open Road Films.

Premise
In preparation for medical school, Ollie Cross joins veteran paramedic Gene Rutkovsky on a drive throughout New York City.

Cast
 Sean Penn as Gene Rutkovsky
 Tye Sheridan as Ollie Cross
 Katherine Waterston as Nancy
 Michael Pitt
 Mike Tyson as Chief Burroughs
 Raquel Nave

Production
Black Flies is an adaptation of the 2008 novel of the same name by Shannon Burke. In December 2018, Ryan King's screenplay for the film was featured on the Black List, an annual survey of the most-liked yet unproduced scripts of the year. By February 2019, Jean-Stéphane Sauvaire came on board to direct, with Mel Gibson and Tye Sheridan in final negotiations to star. In February 2021, Sean Penn replaced Gibson in one of the lead roles and Open Road Films acquired the U.S. distribution rights. Katherine Waterston, Michael Pitt, Mike Tyson, and Raquel Nave were announced to star in the following months. Filming started in May 2022 in New York City with cinematographer David Ungaro.

References

External links
 

American thriller drama films
Films based on American novels
Films directed by Jean-Stéphane Sauvaire
Films set in New York City
Films shot in New York City
Medical-themed films
Open Road Films films
Upcoming English-language films